Taneytown (locally also ) is a city in Carroll County, Maryland, United States. The population was 6,728 at the 2010 census. Taneytown was founded in 1754. Of the city, George Washington once wrote, "Tan-nee town is but a small place with only the Street through wch.(sic) the road passes, built on. The buildings are principally of wood." Taneytown has a history museum that displays the history of the city for visitors and citizens to see. The Bullfrog Road Bridge was listed on the National Register of Historic Places in 1978.

Geography
Taneytown is located at  (39.657099, -77.170627).

Transportation
The primary means of travel to and from Taneytown is by road. Two primary highways serve the city, Maryland Route 140 and Maryland Route 194. MD 140 follows Baltimore Street through central Taneytown. From the city, MD 140 continues eastward to Westminster and Baltimore, while to the west it traverses Emmitsburg before entering Pennsylvania. MD 194 follows Frederick Street and York Street through the city. From Taneytown, MD 194 continues north to Pennsylvania, while heading south, it proceeds into the Frederick area.

Demographics

2010 census
As of the census of 2010, there were 6,728 people, 2,434 households, and 1,813 families living in the city. The racial makeup of the city was 91.3% White, 4.5% African American, 0.1% Native American, 0.7% Asian, 0.5% from other races, and 2.7% from two or more races. Hispanic or Latino of any race were 2.7% of the population.

There were 2,434 households, of which 40.5% had children under the age of 18 living with them, 55.3% were married couples living together, 14.7% had a female householder with no husband present, 4.4% had a male householder with no wife present, and 25.5% were non-families. 20.5% of all households were made up of individuals, and 8.9% had someone living alone who was 65 years of age or older. The average household size was 2.74 and the average family size was 3.14.

The median age in the city was 37 years. 27.9% of residents were under the age of 18; 8.3% were between the ages of 18 and 24; 26.2% were from 25 to 44; 24.3% were from 45 to 64; and 13.3% were 65 years of age or older. The gender makeup of the city was 47.5% male and 52.5% female.

2000 census
As of the census of 2000, there were 5,128 people, 1,786 households, and 1,387 families living in the city. The racial makeup of the city was 96.00% White, 1.74% African American, 0.16% Native American, 0.47% Asian, 0.62% from other races, and 1.01% from two or more races. Hispanic or Latino of any race were 1.50% of the population. 26% of Taneytown's residents were German, 14% Irish, 10% English, 5% Italian, 3% French, 2% Polish, 2% Dutch, and 2% Scottish. People of Scotch-Irish, Lithuanian, Russian, Mexican and Norwegian descent each comprised 1% of the population.

There were 1,786 households, out of which 47.9% had children under the age of 18 living with them, 56.1% were married couples living together, 15.6% had a female householder with no husband present, and 22.3% were non-families. 17.9% of all households were made up of individuals, and 7.1% had someone living alone who was 65 years of age or older. The average household size was 2.87 and the average family size was 3.22.

In the city the population was spread out, with 34.1% under the age of 18, 7.3% from 18 to 24, 35.4% from 25 to 44, 15.7% from 45 to 64, and 7.5% who were 65 years of age or older. The median age was 31 years. For every 100 females, there were 96.1 males. For every 100 females age 18 and over, there were 90.7 males.

The median income for a household in the city was $42,820, and the median income for a family was $49,615. Males had a median income of $31,862 versus $24,261 for females. The per capita income for the city was $16,258. About 9.0% of families and 11.5% of the population were below the poverty line, including 16.7% of those under age 18 and 10.0% of those age 65 or over.

History 
Taneytown was founded in 1754 and became the seat of Taneytown Hundred in colonial Frederick County. Taneytown takes its name from Raphael Taney, a recipient of one of the first land grants in the area, though Taney likely never lived in the city that bears his name.  U.S. Supreme Court Justice Roger Brooke Taney, author of the Dred Scott decision, born in 1777, shares a common ancestor with him, but likely never visited the town or had any connection. When Carroll County was formed on 19 January 1837, Taneytown Hundred and Taneytown were included.

Much of the city was added to the National Register of Historic Places as the Taneytown Historic District in 1986.

There is a Steve Earle song called "Taneytown" on his album El Corazon.

Notable people
Taneytown was home to Fr. Demetrius Augustine Gallitzin, Catholic priest, missionary, and Russian prince during the late 18th century.

Taneytown was the headquarters of Union Army General George Meade for a period during the American Civil War. Fellow Civil War general Jacob G. Lauman was born in Taneytown.

Congressman Joseph A. Goulden of New York was from a family with a house in Taneytown, where he usually stayed during the summer.  Goulden was present in Gettysburg when Abraham Lincoln delivered the Gettysburg Address, and Goulden heard the speech in person.

Actor Fred Gwynne, star of TV's The Munsters, died in Taneytown on July 2, 1993, after he was diagnosed with pancreatic cancer.

Explorer Rogers Birnie was born in Taneytown in 1851. Shortly after his birth his family moved to Gettysburg, Pennsylvania.

References

External links

 City of Taneytown official website
 Taneytown History Museum

 
Cities in Maryland
Cities in Carroll County, Maryland
1754 establishments in Maryland
Populated places established in 1754